Camixaima beraba is a species of beetle in the family Cerambycidae, and the only species in the genus Camixaima. It was described by Martins and Galileo in 1996.

References

Forsteriini
Beetles described in 1996